Wageningen Airstrip  is  north of Wageningen, in the Nickerie District of Suriname. Heavily used for cropdusting agriculture flights in this rice region of the country. Homebase of the Surinam Sky Farmers

Airlines and destinations
Airlines, Charter & Crop dusting companies serving this airport are:

See also

 List of airports in Suriname
 Transport in Suriname

References

External links
OpenStreetMap - Wageningen
Google Maps - Wageningen

Airports in Suriname
Nickerie District